Bridgeport is a village in eastern Belmont County, Ohio, United States. It lies across the Ohio River from Wheeling, West Virginia, at the mouth of Wheeling Creek and is connected by two bridges to Wheeling Island. The population was 1,582 at the 2020 census. It is part of the Wheeling metropolitan area.

History

Bridgeport was originally known as Canton, and under the latter name was laid out in 1806 by Colonel Ebenezer Zane. The present name is for a bridge constructed near the town site in the 1810s.

Geography
Bridgeport is located at  (40.072092, −80.743542), along the Ohio River at the mouth of Wheeling Creek. There are two crossings into West Virginia, the Military Order of the Purple Heart Bridge and a portion of the Fort Henry Bridge. Formerly, the Aetnaville Bridge and Bridgeport Bridge made the crossing to Wheeling Island, but the former has been closed to traffic and the latter has been demolished.

Climate

Demographics

2000 census
As of the census of 2000, there were 2,186 people, 973 households, and 586 families living in the village. The population density was 1,569.0 people per square mile (607.2/km2). There were 1,090 housing units at an average density of 782.3 per square mile (302.8/km2). The racial makeup of the village was 90.81% White, 7.55% African American, 0.14% Native American, 0.14% Asian, 0.55% from other races, and 0.82% from two or more races. Hispanic or Latino of any race were 0.50% of the population.

There were 973 households, out of which 26.9% had children under the age of 18 living with them, 42.0% were married couples living together, 13.7% had a female householder with no husband present, and 39.7% were non-families. 36.1% of all households were made up of individuals, and 15.8% had someone living alone who was 65 years of age or older. The average household size was 2.24 and the average family size was 2.89.

In the village, the population was spread out, with 23.2% under the age of 18, 6.2% from 18 to 24, 29.0% from 25 to 44, 24.5% from 45 to 64, and 17.1% who were 65 years of age or older. The median age was 40 years. For every 100 females, there were 88.9 males. For every 100 females age 18 and over, there were 85.4 males.

The median income for a household in the village was $25,685, and the median income for a family was $33,231. Males had a median income of $24,156 versus $18,333 for females. The per capita income for the village was $14,723. About 11.5% of families and 16.2% of the population were below the poverty line, including 19.1% of those under age 18 and 7.3% of those age 65 or over.

2010 census
As of the census of 2010, there were 1,831 people, 810 households, and 472 families living in the village. The racial makeup of the village was 89.7% White, 6.9% African American, 0.2% Asian, 0.2% from other races, and 3.0% from two or more races. Hispanic or Latino of any race were 0.2% of the population.

There were 810 households, of which 25.4% had children under the age of 18 living with them, 40.2% were married couples living together, 13.3% had a female householder with no husband present, 4.7% had a male householder with no wife present, and 41.7% were non-families. 35.6% of all households were made up of individuals, and 14.9% had someone living alone who was 65 years of age or older. The average household size was 2.26 and the average family size was 2.91.

The median age in the village was 43.3 years. 19.5% of residents were under the age of 18; 9% were between the ages of 18 and 24; 23.5% were from 25 to 44; 30.7% were from 45 to 64; and 17.4% were 65 years of age or older. The gender makeup of the village was 48.8% male and 51.2% female.

Education
Bridgeport has a public library, a branch of the Belmont County District Library.

Notable people

 Johnny Blatnik, former professional baseball player
 Bobby Douglas, Olympic wrestler
 John Havlicek, Hall of Fame basketball player for Ohio State and Boston Celtics
 Bill Jobko, National Football League football player
 Joseph Henry Sharp, painter
 Thomas Clarke Theaker, Republican U.S. Representative from Ohio
 Bill White, Major League Baseball player
 John Todd Zimmer, leading ornithologist

See also
 List of cities and towns along the Ohio River

References

External links
 Bridgeport Exempted Village School District
 Martins Ferry Public Library – Bridgeport Branch
 

Villages in Belmont County, Ohio
Villages in Ohio
Ohio populated places on the Ohio River
1806 establishments in Ohio